The 1920–21 Idaho Vandals men's basketball team represented the University of Idaho during the  college basketball season. The Vandals were led by first-year head coach  and played their home games on campus at the Armory and Gymnasium in Moscow, Idaho.

The Vandals were  overall..

This was the last basketball season before joining the Pacific Coast Conference; Idaho and won the PCC title the first two years as a member.

References

External links
Sports Reference – Idaho Vandals: 1920–21 basketball season
Gem of the Mountains: 1922 (spring 1921) University of Idaho yearbook – 1920–21 basketball season
Idaho Argonaut – student newspaper – 1921 editions

Idaho Vandals men's basketball seasons
Idaho 
Idaho
Idaho